Actinium(III) bromide is a radioactive white crystalline solid that is a salt of actinium. It is prepared by reacting actinium(III) oxide with aluminium bromide at 750 °C.

Reactions
When treated with a mixture of gaseous ammonia and water vapor at 500°C, it turns into actinium oxybromide.

References

Actinium compounds
Bromides